libsndfile is a widely used C library written by Erik de Castro Lopo for reading and writing audio files. It supports a wide variety of audio file formats and will convert automatically from one to another. It allows the programmer to ignore many details, such as endianness.

In addition to the library itself, the package provides command-line programs for converting one format to another (sndfile-convert), for playing audio files (sndfile-play), and for obtaining information about the contents of an audio file (sndfile-info).

libsndfile is available for Unix-like systems, including Linux and Mac OS X, and for Microsoft Windows. It is licensed under LGPL-2.1-or-later.

libsndfile is used, for example, by audio-editing software such as Audacity and Adobe Audition and the MP3 encoder LAME.

See also

Pulse-code modulation
WAV
AIFF

References

External links

Fortran77 interface
Secret Rabbit Code Sample Rate Converter

Audio libraries
C (programming language) libraries
Free audio codecs
Free audio software
Free computer libraries
Free software programmed in C